Lichinga District is a district of Niassa Province in north-western Mozambique. The principal town is Lichinga.

See also
Estamos

Further reading
District profile (PDF)

Districts in Niassa Province
Lichinga District